Pierre Maillard-Verger (5 December 1910 – 30 April 1968) was a French classical pianist and composer.

Born in Paris, Maillard-Verger was a student in Paul Dukas's composition class at the Conservatoire de Paris. In 1939, he won the 1st Grand Prix de Rome for composition with his cantata La farce du Mari fondu.

Maillard-Verger died at the Hôtel-Dieu de Paris in 1968.

Works 
 1939: Cantate du prix de Rome: La farce du Mari fondu
 Music accompanying the reading by Jean Deschamps of La Chanson de Roland (trio of baritones and lute), and that of Antigone by Sophocles
 Caprice, Etude en quartes, Petite Suite (7 easy pieces: Rêverie, Jeux, Polka, Echo, Valse, Plainte, Tarentelle) for piano
 Christmas for choir
 Film scores

Discography as interpreter 
 Mélodies by Fauré, with Camille Maurane
 Mélodies by Fauré, with Pierre Mollet
 Mélodies by Mozart, Schumann, Moussorgski, with Estel Sussman
 Works of the Renaissance with the vocal sextet of France
 Pieces by Beethoven, Mozart, Rameau as pianist

External links 
 Biography on musica et memoria
 Discography (Discogs)
 Pierre Maillard-Verger (1956) performs Ravel, Schumann, Mozart (YouTube)

Prix de Rome for composition
Prize-winners of the International Chopin Piano Competition
French classical composers
French male classical composers
20th-century French male classical pianists
20th-century French composers
Conservatoire de Paris alumni
1910 births
1968 deaths
Musicians from Paris